Siang may refer to:

 Xiang River, a tributary of the Yangtze
 Brahmaputra River, known as Siang in Arunachal Pradesh, India; it gives its name to the following districts:
 East Siang District
 Siang District
 West Siang District
 Upper Siang District
 Siang District

See also 
 
 Ann Siang Hill in Singapore